Skive–Løbet is a professional single-day cycling race held annually in Denmark. It is part of the UCI Europe Tour in category 1.2.

Winners

References

External links

Cycle races in Denmark
UCI Europe Tour races
Recurring sporting events established in 1998
1998 establishments in Denmark
Spring (season) events in Denmark